The Lumberton Cubs was the initial moniker of the minor league baseball teams based in Lumberton, North Carolina from 1947 to 1950. The Lumberton teams played exclusively as members of the Class D level Tobacco State League. The franchise played as the Lumberton Auctioneers in 1949 and 1950. Lumberton hosted home games at Lumberton Armory Field.

The Lumberton Cubs were a minor league affiliate of the Chicago Cubs from 1947 to 1949.

History 
Lumberton, North Carolina first hosted minor league play in 1947. The Lumberton "Cubs" began play as members of the eight–team Class D level Tobacco State League as a minor league affiliate of the Chicago Cubs. The Clinton Blues, Dunn-Erwin Twins, Red Springs Red Robins, Sanford Spinners, Smithfield-Selma Leafs, Warsaw Red Sox and Wilmington Pirates joined Lumberton in league play.

The Lumberton minor league franchise was formed in 1947. Reportedly a group of 10 local businessmen, including Tim Murcheson, led an effort to the apply to the Tobacco State League for membership. The league accepted the application and expanded from six to eight teams, adding Lumberton and Red Springs as new members for the 1947 season. Jack Sheahan was president of the franchise in 1947; Harold K. George, vice president and Elton Frazier, business manager.

The home opener at Lumberton was on April 24, 1947. It was noted the Fairmont and Lumberton High School bands performed, as Reverend R.L. Alexander served as master of ceremonies. Lumberton Mayor “Rom” A. Hedgpeth addressed the 3,000 fans in attendance before the games. Mrs. M.F. Townsend and Henry McDuffie sing the national anthem. Lumberton lost to Red Springs, 14–3 in the opening game.

In their first season of play, the 1947 Lumberton Cubs ended the season in 2nd place. Playing in the eight–team league, Lumberton ended the regular season with a 71–49 record under manager Red Lucas. Lumberton finished 12.5 games behind of the 1st place Sanford Spinners. In the playoffs, Lumberton first defeated the Dunn-Erwin Twins 4 games to 1 to advance. The Cubs lost to Sanford 4 games to 3 in the final series.

In 1948, the Lumberton Cubs continued play as members of the Class D level Tobacco State League. The Cubs ended the regular season in 7th place with an 55–81 record, playing under manager Charles Jamin. Lumberton finished 25.0 games behind the of the 1st placed Sanford Spinners in the final standings. Lumberton did not qualify for the playoffs, won by the Reeds Springs Robins.

Continuing play in the 1949 Tobacco State League, the Lumberton Auctioneers placed 3rd in the eight–team league in their final season as a Chicago Cubs affiliate. The Auctioneers finished the regular season with a record of 75–61, playing under managers Red Lucas and Jim Guinn. Lumberton finished 6.5 games behind the 1st place Dunn-Erwin Twins in the regular season standings. Lumberton lost in the 1st round playoff series against the Dunn-Erwin Twins 4 games to 1.

In 1949,  it was reported the team held a contest to pick a new name for the team. Reverend R.L. Alexander led six other judges in picking the winner, and the Lumberton "Auctioneers" was chosen. The club was generally referred to as the Auks. It was noted Murphy Bowman was the Lumberton franchise president. R.A. Hedgpeth was the vice-president and Buddy Frazier continued as business manager.
 
In their final season, the 1950 Lumberton Auctioneers won the Tobacco State League pennant. On July 12, 1950, John Gerace of Lumberton threw a no-hitter in a 5–0 victory over the Red Springs Red Robins. With a 93–41 regular season record, the Auctioneers placed 1st in the regular season standings, finishing 1.5 games ahead of the 2nd place Sanford Spinners. Led by manager John Streza, Lumberton proceeded to the playoffs, losing to the Rockingham Eagles 4 games to 2. Lumberton reportedly lost the first two playoff games at home and won two games on the road. The Auctioneers played their last game with a 17–inning 7–6 loss. The Tobacco State League permanently folded following the 1950 season.

Lumberton, North Carolina has not hosted another minor league team.

The ballpark
The Lumberton minor league teams were noted to have played home games at the Lumberton Armory Field. The ballpark reportedly underwent improvements to begin hosting minor league games in 1947, including new sod on the infield, improved restrooms and updated grandstands. In 1948, it was reported a roof was built over the grandstands and a visiting locker room was constructed. 1947 admission was 65 cents for adults, 35 cents for high school students and 25 cents for children younger than 12. The site today contains the Bill Sapp Recreation Center. The location is 1100 North Cedar Street, Lumberton, North Carolina.

Timeline

Year–by–year records

Notable alumni

Mel Bosser (1949)
Red Lucas (1947, 1949, MGR)
Mike Milosevich (1950)
Charlie Osgood (1947)
Bob Spicer (1947)
Turkey Tyson (1949)
Verlon Walker (1948)

See also
Lumberton Cubs playersLumberton Auctioneers players

References

External links
Baseball Reference

Defunct minor league baseball teams
Professional baseball teams in North Carolina
Defunct baseball teams in North Carolina
Baseball teams established in 1947
Baseball teams disestablished in 1948
Chicago Cubs minor league affiliates
Robeson County, North Carolina
Tobacco State League teams